Emilija Redžepi is a Kosovan Bosniak politician, and is a member of the New Democratic Party who sits in the Assembly of the Republic of Kosovo.

Career
Emilija Redžepi is a Bosniak in Kosovo. She has been critical of the lack of support for Bosniak affairs within Kosovo, speaking at a conference on the Day of Bosniak Community she supported teaching in Bosnian and upholding traditions. As well as being a Member of the Assembly of the Republic of Kosovo, where she is a member of the New Democratic Party, she has spoken of external affairs, encouraging Bosnia and Herzegovina to abandon the requirements for Kosovans to have travel visas to cross the border.

Her daughter was briefly kidnapped in 2015, which Redžepi perceived as a threat to be "careful what she is doing". In 2017, she announced her candidacy for Mayor of Prizren, which has a notable Bosniak population. This was after receiving the support of her party. She ended up receiving less than 5% of the vote. Later that year, she supported a vote of no confidence in the government coalition.

References

Living people
Kosovan women in politics
Kosovan people of Bosniak descent
Members of the Assembly of the Republic of Kosovo
21st-century women politicians
Year of birth missing (living people)
Deputy Prime Ministers of Kosovo
Government ministers of Kosovo
Women government ministers of Kosovo